The history of agriculture in the United States covers the period from the first English settlers to the present day. In Colonial America, agriculture was the primary livelihood for 90% of the population, and most towns were shipping points for the export of agricultural products. Most farms were geared toward subsistence production for family use. The rapid growth of population and the expansion of the frontier opened up large numbers of new farms, and clearing the land was a major preoccupation of farmers. After 1800, cotton became the chief crop in southern plantations, and the chief American export.  After 1840, industrialization and urbanization opened up lucrative domestic markets. The number of farms grew from 1.4 million in 1850, to 4.0 million in 1880, and 6.4 million in 1910; then started to fall, dropping to 5.6 million in 1950 and 2.2 million in 2008.

Pre-Colonial era

Prior to the arrival of Europeans in North America, the continent supported a diverse range of indigenous cultures. While some populations were primarily hunter-gatherers, other populations relied on agriculture. Native Americans farmed domesticated crops in the Eastern Woodlands, the Great Plains, and the American Southwest.

Colonial farming: 1610–1775 
The first settlers in Plymouth Colony planted barley and peas from England but their most important crop was Indian corn (maize) which they were shown how to cultivate by the native Squanto.  To fertilize this crop, they used small fish which they called herrings or shads.

Plantation agriculture, using slaves, developed in Virginia and Maryland (where tobacco was grown), and South Carolina (where indigo and rice was grown). Cotton became a major plantation crop after 1800 in the "Black Belt," that is the region from North Carolina in an arc through Texas where the climate allowed for cotton cultivation.

Apart from the tobacco and rice plantations, the great majority of farms were subsistence, producing food for the family and some for trade and taxes. Throughout the colonial period, subsistence farming was pervasive. Farmers supplemented their income with sales of surplus crops or animals in the local market, or by exports to the slave colonies in the British West Indies. Logging, hunting and fishing supplemented the family economy.

Ethnic farming styles
Ethnicity made a difference in agricultural practice. German Americans brought with them practices and traditions that were quite different from those of the English and Scots. They adapted Old World techniques to a much more abundant land supply. For example, they generally preferred oxen to horses for plowing. Furthermore, the Germans showed a long-term tendency to keep the farm in the family and to avoid having their children move to towns.  The Scots Irish built their livelihoods on some farming but more herding (of hogs and cattle). In the American colonies, the Scots-Irish focused on mixed farming. Using this technique, they grew corn for human consumption and for livestock feed, especially for hogs. Many improvement-minded farmers of different backgrounds began using new agricultural practices to increase their output. During the 1750s, these agricultural innovators replaced the hand sickles and scythes used to harvest hay, wheat, and barley with the cradle scythe, a tool with wooden fingers that arranged the stalks of grain for easy collection. This tool was able to triple the amount of work done by a farmer in one day. A few scientifically informed farmers (mostly wealthy planters like George Washington) began fertilizing their fields with dung and lime and rotating their crops to keep the soil fertile.

Before 1720, most colonists in the mid-Atlantic region worked in small-scale farming and paid for imported manufactures by supplying the West Indies with corn and flour. In New York, a fur-pelt export trade to Europe flourished and added additional wealth to the region. After 1720, mid-Atlantic farming was stimulated by the international demand for wheat. A massive population explosion in Europe drove wheat prices up. By 1770, a bushel of wheat cost twice as much as it did in 1720.  Farmers also expanded their production of flaxseed and corn since flax was in high demand in the Irish linen industry and a demand for corn existed in the West Indies.

Many poor German immigrants and Scots-Irish settlers began their careers as agricultural wage laborers. Merchants and artisans hired teen-aged indentured servants, paying the transportation over from Europe, as workers for a domestic system for the manufacture of cloth and other goods. Merchants often bought wool and flax from farmers and employed newly arrived immigrants who had been textile workers in Ireland and Germany to work in their homes spinning the materials into yarn and cloth. Large farmers and merchants became wealthy, while farmers with smaller farms and artisans only made enough for subsistence.

New nation: 1776–1860
The U.S. economy was primarily agricultural in the early 19th century.  Westward expansion, including the Louisiana Purchase and American victory in the War of 1812 plus the building of canals and the introduction of steamboats opened up new areas for agriculture.  Most farming was designed to produce food for the family, and service small local markets. In times of rapid economic growth, a farmer could still improve the land for far more than he paid for it, and then move further west to repeat the process. While the land was cheap and fertile the process of clearing it and building farmsteads wasn't. Frontier life wasn't new for Americans but presented new challenges for farm families who faced the challenges of bringing their produce to market across vast distances.

South
In the Southern United States, the poor lands were held by poor white farmers, who generally owned no slaves.  The best lands were held by rich plantation owners, were operated primarily with slave labor. These farms grew their own food and also concentrated on a few crops that could be exported to meet the growing demand in Europe, especially cotton, tobacco, and sugar. The cotton gin made it possible to increase cotton production. Cotton became the main export crop, but after a few years, the fertility of the soil was depleted and the plantation was moved to the new land further west. Much land was cleared and put into growing cotton in the Mississippi valley and in Alabama, and new grain growing areas were brought into production in the Mid West.  Eventually this put severe downward pressure on prices, particularly of cotton, first from 1820–23 and again from 1840–43.  Sugar cane was being grown in Louisiana, where it was refined into granular sugar.  Growing and refining sugar required a large amount of capital.  Some of the nation's wealthiest men owned sugar plantations, which often had their own sugar mills.

New England
In New England, subsistence agriculture gave way after 1810 to production to provide food supplies for the rapidly growing industrial towns and cities. New specialty export crops were introduced such as tobacco and cranberries.

Western frontier

The British Empire had attempted to restrict westward expansion with the ineffective Proclamation Line of 1763, abolished after the American Revolutionary War. The first major movement west of the Appalachian Mountains began in Pennsylvania, Virginia and North Carolina as soon as the war was won in 1781. Pioneers housed themselves in a rough lean-to or at most a one-room log cabin. The main food supply at first came from hunting deer, turkeys, and other abundant small game.

Clad in typical frontier garb, leather breeches, moccasins, fur cap, and hunting shirt, and girded by a belt from which hung a hunting knife and a shot pouch – all homemade – the pioneer presented a unique appearance. In a short time he opened in the woods a patch, or clearing, on which he grew corn, wheat, flax, tobacco and other products, even fruit. In a few years the pioneer added hogs,  sheep and cattle, and perhaps acquired a horse. Homespun clothing replaced the animal skins. The more restless pioneers grew dissatisfied with over civilized life, and uprooted themselves again to move 50 or hundred miles (80 or 160 km) further west.

In 1788, American pioneers to the Northwest Territory established Marietta, Ohio as the first permanent American settlement in the Northwest Territory.  By 1813 the western frontier had reached the Mississippi River. St. Louis, Missouri was the largest town on the frontier, the gateway for travel westward, and a principal trading center for Mississippi River traffic and inland commerce.  There was wide agreement on the need to settle the new territories quickly, but the debate polarized over the price the government should charge. The conservatives and Whigs, typified by president John Quincy Adams, wanted a moderated pace that charged the newcomers enough to pay the costs of the federal government. The Democrats, however, tolerated a wild scramble for land at very low prices. The final resolution came in the Homestead Law of 1862, with a moderated pace that gave settlers 160 acres free after they worked on it for five years.

From the 1770s to the 1830s, pioneers moved into the new lands that stretched from Kentucky to Alabama to Texas. Most were farmers who moved in family groups.  Historian Louis M. Hacker shows how wasteful the first generation of pioneers was; they were too ignorant to cultivate the land properly and when the natural fertility of virgin land was used up, they sold out and moved west to try again. Hacker describes that in Kentucky about 1812:

Hacker adds that the second wave of settlers reclaimed the land, repaired the damage, and practiced a more sustainable agriculture.

Railroad age: 1860–1910

A dramatic expansion in farming took place from 1860 to 1910 as cheap rail transportation opened the way for exports to Europe. The number of farms tripled from 2.0 million in 1860 to 6.0 million in 1906. The number of people living on farms grew from about 10 million in 1860 to 22 million in 1880 to 31 million in 1905.  The value of farms soared from $8 billion in 1860 to $30 billion in 1906.

The federal government issued  tracts for very cheap costs to about 400,000 families who settled new land under the Homestead Act of 1862.  Even larger numbers purchased lands at very low interest from the new railroads, which were trying to create markets. The railroads advertised heavily in Europe and brought over, at low fares, hundreds of thousands of farmers from Germany, Scandinavia, and Britain. The Government of Canada's Dominion Lands Act of 1872 served a similar function for establishing homesteads on the prairies in Canada.

The first years of the 20th century were prosperous for all American farmers. The years 1910–1914 became a statistical benchmark, called "parity", that organized farm groups wanted the government to use as a benchmark for the level of prices and profits they felt they deserved.

Rural life

Early settlers discovered that the Great Plains were not the "Great American Desert," but they also found that the very harsh climate—with tornadoes, blizzards, drought, hail storms, floods, and grasshopper plaguess—made for a high risk of ruined crops. Many early settlers were financially ruined, especially in the early 1890s, and either protested through the Populist movement, or went back east.  In the 20th century, crop insurance, new conservation techniques, and large-scale federal aid all lowered the risk. Immigrants, especially Germans, and their children comprised the largest element of settlers after 1860; they were attracted by the good soil, low-priced lands from the railroad companies. The railroads offered attractive Family packages. They brought in European families, with their tools, directly to the new farm, which was purchased on easy credit terms. The railroad needed settlers as much as the settlers needed farmland.  Even cheaper land was available through homesteading, although it was usually not as well located as railroad land.

The problem of blowing dust resulted from too little rainfall for growing enough wheat to keep the topsoil from blowing away. In the 1930s, techniques and technologies of soil conservation, most of which had been available but ignored before the Dust Bowl conditions began, were promoted by the Soil Conservation Service (SCS) of the US Department of Agriculture, so that, with cooperation from the weather, soil condition was much improved by 1940.

On the Great Plains, very few single men attempted to operate a farm or ranch; farmers clearly understood the need for a hard-working wife, and numerous children, to handle the many chores, including child-rearing, feeding and clothing the family, managing the housework, feeding the hired hands, and, especially after the 1930s, handling the paperwork and financial details. During the early years of settlement in the late 19th century, farm women played an integral role in assuring family survival by working outdoors. After a generation or so, women increasingly left the fields, thus redefining their roles within the family. New conveniences such as sewing and washing machines encouraged women to turn to domestic roles. The scientific housekeeping movement, promoted across the land by the media and government extension agents, as well as county fairs which featured achievements in home cookery and canning, advice columns for women in the farm papers, and home economics courses in the schools.

Although the eastern image of farm life on the prairies emphasizes the isolation of the lonely farmer and farm life, rural folk created a rich social life for themselves. They often sponsored activities that combined work, food, and entertainment such as barn raisings, corn huskings, quilting bees, grange meeting, church activities, and school functions. The womenfolk organized shared meals and potluck events, as well as extended visits between families.

Women were also involved in poultry breeding. In 1896, farmer Nettie Metcalf created the Buckeye chicken breed in Warren, Ohio. In 1905, Buckeyes became an official breed under the American Poultry Association. The Buckeye breed is the first recorded chicken breed to be created and developed by a woman.

Ranching
Much of the Great Plains became open range, hosting cattle ranching operations on public land without charge. In the spring and fall, ranchers held roundups where their cowboys branded new calves, treated animals and sorted the cattle for sale. Such ranching began in Texas and gradually moved northward. Cowboys drove Texas cattle north to railroad lines in the cities of Dodge City, Kansas and Ogallala, Nebraska; from there, cattle were shipped eastward. British investors financed many great ranches of the era. Overstocking of the range and the terrible Winter of 1886–87 resulted in a disaster, with many cattle starved and frozen to death. From then on, ranchers generally raised feed to ensure they could keep their cattle alive over winter.

When there was too little rain for row crop farming, but enough grass for grazing, cattle ranching became dominant.  Before the railroads arrived in Texas the 1870s cattle drives took large herds from Texas to the railheads in Kansas.  A few thousand Indians resisted, notably the Sioux, who were reluctant to settle on reservations. However, most Indians themselves became ranch hands and cowboys.  New varieties of wheat flourished in the arid parts of the Great Plains, opening much of the Dakotas, Montana, western Kansas, western Nebraska and eastern Colorado. Where it was too dry for wheat, the settlers turned to cattle ranching.

South, 1860–1940
Agriculture in the South was oriented toward large-scale plantations that produced cotton for export, as well as other export products such as tobacco and sugar. During the American Civil War, the Union blockade shut down 95 percent of the export business.  Some cotton got out through blockade runners, and in conquered areas much was bought by northern speculators for shipment to Europe. The great majority of white farmers worked on small subsistence farms, that supplied the needs of the family and the local market.  After the war, the world price of cotton plunged, the plantations were broken into small farms for the Freedmen, and poor whites started growing cotton because they needed the money to pay taxes.

Sharecropping became widespread in the South as a response to economic upheaval caused by the end of slavery during and after Reconstruction.  Sharecropping was a way for very poor farmers, both white and black, to earn a living from land owned by someone else.  The landowner provided land, housing, tools and seed, and perhaps a mule, and a local merchant provided food and supplies on credit. At harvest time the sharecropper received a share of the crop (from one-third to one-half, with the landowner taking the rest). The cropper used his share to pay off his debt to the merchant. The system started with blacks when large plantations were subdivided. By the 1880s, white farmers also became sharecroppers. The system was distinct from that of the tenant farmer, who rented the land, provided his own tools and mule, and received half the crop. Landowners provided more supervision to sharecroppers, and less or none to tenant farmers.  Poverty was inevitable, because world cotton prices were low.

Sawers (2005) shows how southern farmers made the mule their preferred draft animal in the South during the 1860s–1920s, primarily because it fit better with the region's geography. Mules better withstood the heat of summer, and their smaller size and hooves were well suited for such crops as cotton, tobacco, and sugar. The character of soils and climate in the lower South hindered the creation of pastures, so the mule breeding industry was concentrated in the border states of Missouri, Kentucky, and Tennessee. Transportation costs combined with topography to influence the prices of mules and horses, which in turn affected patterns of mule use. The economic and production advantages associated with mules made their use a progressive step for Southern agriculture that endured until the mechanization brought by tractors. Beginning around the mid-20th century, Texas began to transform from a rural and agricultural state to one that was urban and industrialized.

Grange
The Grange was an organization founded in 1867 for farmers and their wives that was strongest in the Northeast, and which promoted the modernization not only of farming practices but also of family and community life. It is still in operation.

Membership soared from 1873 (200,000) to 1875 (858,050) as many of the state and local granges adopted non-partisan political resolutions, especially regarding the regulation of railroad transportation costs. The organization was unusual in that it allowed women and teens as equal members. Rapid growth infused the national organization with money from dues, and many local granges established consumer cooperatives, initially supplied by the Chicago wholesaler Aaron Montgomery Ward. Poor fiscal management, combined with organizational difficulties resulting from rapid growth, led to a massive decline in membership. By around the start of the 20th century, the Grange rebounded and membership stabilized.

In the mid-1870s, state Granges in the Midwest were successful in passing state laws that regulated the rates they could be charged by railroads and grain warehouses. The birth of the federal government's Cooperative Extension Service, Rural Free Delivery, and the Farm Credit System were largely due to Grange lobbying. The peak of their political power was marked by their success in Munn v. Illinois, which held that the grain warehouses were a "private utility in the public interest," and therefore could be regulated by public law (see references below, "The Granger Movement"). During the Progressive Era (1890s–1920s), political parties took up Grange causes. Consequently, local Granges focused more on community service, although the State and National Granges remain a political force.

World War I

The U.S. in World War I, was a critical supplier to other Allied nations, as millions of European farmers were in the army. The rapid expansion of the farms coupled with the diffusion of trucks and Model T cars, and the tractor, allowed the agricultural market to expand to an unprecedented size.

During World War I prices shot up and farmers borrowed heavily to buy out their neighbors and expand their holdings. This gave them very high debts that made them vulnerable to the downturn in farm prices in 1920. Throughout the 1920s and down to 1934 low prices and high debt were major problems for farmers in all regions.

Beginning with the 1917 US National War Garden Commission, the government encouraged Victory gardens, agricultural plantings in private yards and public parks for personal use and for the war effort. Production from these gardens exceeded $1.2 billion by the end of World War I. Victory gardens were later encouraged during World War II when rationing made for food shortages.

1920s

A popular Tin Pan Alley song of 1919 asked, concerning the United States troops returning from World War I, "How Ya Gonna Keep 'em Down on the Farm (After They've Seen Paree)?".  As the song hints, many did not remain "down on the farm"; there was a great migration of youth from farms to nearby towns and smaller cities. The average distance moved was only 10 miles (16 km). Few went to the cities over 100,000. However, agriculture became increasingly mechanized with widespread use of the tractor, other heavy equipment, and superior techniques disseminated through County Agents, who were employed by state agricultural colleges and funded by the Federal government.
The early 1920s saw a rapid expansion in the American agricultural economy largely due to new technologies and especially mechanization.  Competition from Europe and Russia had disappeared due to the war and American agricultural goods were being shipped around the world.

The new technologies, such as the combine harvester, meant that the most efficient farms were larger in size and, gradually, the small family farm that had long been the model were replaced by larger and more business-oriented firms. Despite this increase in farm size and capital intensity, the great majority of agricultural production continued to be undertaken by family-owned enterprises.

World War I had created an atmosphere of high prices for agricultural products as European nations demand for exports surged. Farmers had enjoyed a period of prosperity as U.S. farm production expanded rapidly to fill the gap left as European belligerents found themselves unable to produce enough food. When the war ended, supply increased rapidly as Europe's agricultural market rebounded. Overproduction led to plummeting prices which led to stagnant market conditions and living standards for farmers in the 1920s. Worse, hundreds of thousands of farmers had taken out mortgages and loans to buy out their neighbors' property, and now are unable to meet the financial burden. The cause was the collapse of land prices after the wartime bubble when farmers used high prices to buy up neighboring farms at high prices, saddling them with heavy debts. Farmers, however, blamed the decline of foreign markets, and the effects of the protective tariff.

Farmers demanded relief as the agricultural depression grew steadily worse in the middle 1920s, while the rest of the economy flourished.  Farmers had a powerful voice in Congress, and demanded federal subsidies, most notably the McNary–Haugen Farm Relief Bill. It was passed but vetoed by President Calvin Coolidge. Coolidge instead supported the alternative program of Commerce Secretary Herbert Hoover and Agriculture Secretary William M. Jardine to modernize farming, by bringing in more electricity, more efficient equipment, better seeds and breeds, more rural education, and better business practices. Hoover advocated the creation of a Federal Farm Board which was dedicated to restriction of crop production to domestic demand, behind a tariff wall, and maintained that the farmer's ailments were due to defective distribution. In 1929, the Hoover plan was adopted.

1930s

New Deal farm and rural programs

President Franklin D. Roosevelt, a liberal Democrat, was keenly interested in farm issues and believed that true prosperity would not return until farming was prosperous.   Many different New Deal programs were directed at farmers. Farming reached its low point in 1932, but even then millions of unemployed people were returning to the family farm having given up hope for a job in the cities.  The main New Deal strategy was to reduce the supply of commodities, thereby raising the prices a little to the consumer, and a great deal to the farmer. Marginal farmers produce too little to be helped by the strategy; specialized relief programs were developed for them. Prosperity largely returned to the farm by 1936.

Roosevelt's "First Hundred Days" produced the Farm Security Act to raise farm incomes by raising the prices farmers received, which was achieved by reducing total farm output. In May 1933 the Agricultural Adjustment Act created the Agricultural Adjustment Administration (AAA). The act reflected the demands of leaders of major farm organizations, especially the Farm Bureau, and reflected debates among Roosevelt's farm advisers such as Secretary of Agriculture Henry A. Wallace, M.L. Wilson, Rexford Tugwell, and George Peek.

The aim of the AAA was to raise prices for commodities through artificial scarcity. The AAA used a system of "domestic allotments", setting total output of corn, cotton, dairy products, hogs, rice, tobacco, and wheat. The farmers themselves had a voice in the process of using government to benefit their incomes. The AAA paid land owners subsidies for leaving some of their land idle with funds provided by a new tax on food processing. The goal was to force up farm prices to the point of "parity", an index based on 1910–1914 prices. To meet 1933 goals,  of growing cotton was plowed up, bountiful crops were left to rot, and six million piglets were killed and discarded. The idea was the less produced, the higher the wholesale price and the higher income to the farmer. Farm incomes increased significantly in the first three years of the New Deal, as prices for commodities rose. Food prices remained well below 1929 levels.

The AAA established a long-lasting federal role in the planning of the entire agricultural sector of the economy, and was the first program on such a scale on behalf of the troubled agricultural economy. The original AAA did not provide for any sharecroppers or tenants or farm laborers who might become unemployed, but there were other New Deal programs especially for them, such as the Farm Security Administration.

In 1936, the Supreme Court of the United States declared the AAA to be unconstitutional for technical reasons; it was replaced by a similar program that did win Court approval. Instead of paying farmers for letting fields lie barren, the new program instead subsidized them for planting soil enriching crops such as alfalfa that would not be sold on the market. Federal regulation of agricultural production has been modified many times since then, but together with large subsidies the basic philosophy of subsidizing farmers is still in effect in 2015.

Rural relief

Many rural people lived in severe poverty, especially in the South. Major programs addressed to their needs included the Resettlement Administration (RA), the Rural Electrification Administration (REA), rural welfare projects sponsored by the WPA, NYA, Forest Service and CCC, including school lunches, building new schools, opening roads in remote areas, reforestation, and purchase of marginal lands to enlarge national forests. In 1933, the Administration launched the Tennessee Valley Authority, a project involving dam construction planning on an unprecedented scale in order to curb flooding, generate electricity, and modernize the very poor farms in the Tennessee Valley region of the Southern United States.

For the first time, there was a national program to help migrant and marginal farmers, through programs such as the Resettlement Administration and the Farm Security Administration. Their plight gained national attention through the 1939 novel and film The Grapes of Wrath.  The New Deal thought there were too many farmers, and resisted demands of the poor for loans to buy farms. However, it made a major effort to upgrade the health facilities available to a sickly population.

Economics and Labor
In the 1930s, during the Great Depression, farm labor organized a number of strikes in various states. 1933 was a particularly active year with strikes including the California agricultural strikes of 1933, the 1933 Yakima Valley strike in Washington, and the 1933 Wisconsin milk strike.

Agriculture was prosperous during World War II, even as rationing and price controls limited the availability of meat and other foods in order to guarantee its availability to the American And Allied armed forces. During World War II, farmers were not drafted, but surplus labor, especially in the southern cotton fields, voluntarily relocated to war jobs in the cities.

During World War II, victory gardens planted at private residences and public parks were an important source of fresh produce. These gardens were encouraged by the United States Department of Agriculture.  Around one third of the vegetables produced by the United States came from victory gardens.

Since 1945

Government policies

The New Deal era farm programs were continued into the 1940s and 1950s, with the goal of supporting the prices received by farmers. Typical programs involved farm loans, commodity subsidies, and price supports.  The rapid decline in the farm population led to a smaller voice in Congress.  So the well-organized Farm Bureau and other lobbyists, worked in the 1970s to appeal to urban Congressman through food stamp programs for the poor. By 2000, the food stamp program was the largest component of the farm bill. In 2010, the Tea Party movement brought in many Republicans committed to cutting all federal subsidies, including those agriculture. Meanwhile, urban Democrats strongly opposed reductions,  pointing to the severe hardships caused by the 2008–10 economic recession. Though the Agricultural Act of 2014 saw many rural Republican Congressman voting against the program, it passed with bipartisan support.

Changing technology
Ammonia from plants built during World War II to make explosives became available for making fertilizers, leading to a permanent decline in real fertilizer prices and expanded use.   The early 1950s was the peak period for tractor sales in the U.S. as the few remaining mules and work horses were sold for dog food. The horsepower of farm machinery underwent a large expansion. A successful cotton picking machine was introduced in 1949. The machine could do the work of 50 men picking by hand. The great majority of unskilled farm laborers move to urban areas.

Research on plant breeding produced varieties of grain crops that could produce high yields with heavy fertilizer input. This resulted in the Green revolution, beginning in the 1940s. By 2000 yields of corn (maize) had risen by a factor of over four. Wheat and soybean yields also rose significantly.

Economics and labor
After 1945, a continued annual 2% increase in productivity (as opposed to 1% from 1835–1935) led to further increases in farm size and corresponding reductions in the number of farms. Many farmers sold out and moved to nearby towns and cities. Others switched to part-time operation, supported by off-farm employment.

The 1960s and 1970s saw major farm worker strikes including the 1965 Delano grape strike and the 1970 Salad Bowl strike. In 1975, the California Agricultural Labor Relations Act of 1975 was enacted, establishing the right to collective bargaining for farmworkers in California, a first in U.S. history. Individuals with prominent roles in farm worker organizing in this period include Cesar Chavez, Dolores Huerta, Larry Itliong, and Philip Vera Cruz. Chavez mobilized California workers into the United Farm Workers organization.

In 1990, undocumented workers made up an estimated 14 percent of the farm workforce. By the year 2000, the percentage had grown to over 50%, and has remained around 50% in the 2000-2020 period.

In 2015, grain farmers started taking "an extreme step, one not widely seen since the 1980s" by breaching lease contracts with their landowners, reducing the amount of land they sow and risking long legal battles with landlords.

Technology
New machinery—especially large self-propelled combines and mechanical cotton pickers—sharply reduced labor requirements in harvesting.

In addition, electric motors and irrigation pumps opened up new ways to be efficient. Electricity also played a role in making major innovations in animal husbandry possible, especially modern milking parlors, grain elevators, and CAFOs (confined animal-feeding operations). Advances in fertilizers, herbicides, insecticides and fungicides, the use of antibiotics and growth hormones. Significant advances occurred in plant breeding and animal breeding, such as crop hybridization, GMOs (genetically modified organisms), and artificial insemination of livestock. Post-harvest innovations occurred in food processing and food distribution (e.g. frozen foods).

Crops

Wheat

Wheat, used for white bread, pastries, pasta, and pizza, has been the principal cereal crop since the 18th century. It was introduced by the first English colonists and quickly became the main cash crop of farmers who sold it to urban populations and exporters.  In colonial times its culture became concentrated in the Middle Colonies, which became known as the "bread colonies". In the mid-18th century, wheat culture spread to the tidewaters of Maryland and Virginia, where George Washington was a prominent grower as he diversified away from tobacco. The crop moved west, with Ohio as the center in 1840 and Illinois in 1860. Illinois replaced its wheat with corn (which was used locally to feed hogs). The invention of mechanical harvesters, drawn first by horses and then tractors, made larger farms much more efficient than small ones. The farmers had to borrow money to buy land and equipment and had to specialize in wheat, which made them highly vulnerable to price fluctuations and gave them an incentive to ask for government help to stabilize or raise prices.  Wheat farming depended on significant labor input only during planting, and especially at harvest time.  Therefore, successful farmers, especially on the Great Plains, bought up as much land as possible, purchased very expensive mechanical equipment, and depended on migrating hired laborers at harvesting time. The migrant families tended to be social outcasts without local roots and mostly lived near the poverty line, except in the harvesting season. From 1909 to today, North Dakota and Kansas have vied for first place in wheat production, followed by Oklahoma and Montana.

In the colonial era, wheat was sown by broadcasting, reaped by sickles, and threshed by flails. The kernels were then taken to a grist mill for grinding into flour. In 1830, it took four people and two oxen, working 10 hours a day, to produce 200 bushels.  New technology greatly increased productivity in the 19th century, as sowing with drills replaced broadcasting, cradles took the place of sickles, and the cradles in turn were replaced by reapers and binders. Steam-powered threshing machines superseded flails.  By 1895, in Bonanza farms in the Dakotas, it took six people and 36 horses pulling huge harvesters, working 10 hours a day, to produce 20,000 bushels.  In the 1930s the gasoline powered "combine" combined reaping and threshing into one operation that took one person to operate.  Production grew from 85 million bushels in 1839, 500 million in 1880, 600 million in 1900, and peaked at 1.0 billion bushels in 1915.  Prices fluctuated erratically, with a downward trend in the 1890s that caused great distress in the Plains states.

The marketing of wheat was modernized as well, as the cost of transportation steadily fell and more and more distant markets opened up. Before 1850, the crop was sacked, shipped by wagon or canal boat, and stored in warehouses. With the rapid growth of the nation's railroad network in the 1850s–1870s, farmers took their harvest by wagon for sale to the nearest country elevators. The wheat moved to terminal elevators, where it was sold through grain exchanges to flour millers and exporters. Since the elevators and railroads generally had a local monopoly, farmers soon had targets besides the weather for their complaints. They sometimes accused the elevator men of undergrading, shortweighting, and excessive dockage. Scandinavian immigrants in the Midwest took control over marketing through the organization of cooperatives.

Varieties

Following the invention of the steel roller mill in 1878, hard varieties of wheat such as Turkey Red became more popular than soft, which had been previously preferred because they were easier for grist mills to grind.

Wheat production witnessed major changes in varieties and cultural practices since 1870. Thanks to these innovations, vast expanses of the wheat belt now support commercial production, and yields have resisted the negative impact of insects, diseases, and weeds. Biological innovations contributed roughly half of labor-productivity growth between 1839 and 1909.

In the late 19th century, hardy new wheat varieties from the Russian steppes were introduced on the Great Plains by the Volga Germans who settled in North Dakota, Kansas, Montana and neighboring states.  Legend credits the miller Bernhard Warkentin (1847–1908), a German Mennonite from Russia for introducing the "Turkey red" variety from Russia. More exactly, in the 1880s numerous millers and government agricultural agents worked to create "Turkey red" and make Kansas the "Wheat State". The U.S. Dept. of Agriculture, and the state experiment stations, have developed many new varieties, and taught farmers how to plant them. Similar varieties now dominate in the arid regions of the Great Plains.

Exports
Wheat farmers have always produced a surplus for export. The exports were small-scale until the 1860s, when bad crops in Europe, and lower costs  due to cheaper railroads and ocean transport, opened the European markets to cheap American wheat.  The British in particular depended on American wheat during the 1860s for a fourth of their food supply, making the government reluctant to risk a cutoff if it  supported the Confederacy.  By 1880, 150,000,000 bushels were exported to the value of $190,000,000.  World War I saw large numbers of young European farmers conscripted into the armies, so Allied countries, particularly France and Italy depended on American shipments, which ranged from 100,000,000 to 260,000,000 bushels a year.  American farmers reacted to the heavy demand and high prices by expanding their production, many taking out mortgages to buy out their neighbors farms.  This led to a large surplus in the 1920s. The resulting low prices prompted growers to seek government support of prices, first through the McNary-Haugen bills, which failed in Congress, and later in the New Deal through the Agricultural Adjustment Act of 1933 and its many versions.

World War II brought an enormous expansion of production, topping off at a billion bushels in 1944. During the war and after large-scale wheat and flour exports were part of Lend Lease and the foreign assistance programs. In 1966 exports reached 860 million bushels of which 570 million were given away as food aid. A major drought in the Soviet Union in 1972 led to the sale of 390 million bushels and an agreement was assigned in 1975 under the détente policy to supply the Soviets with grain over a five-year period.

Marketing
By 1900 private grain exchanges settled the daily prices for North American wheat. Santon (2010) explains how the AAA programs set wheat prices in the U.S. after 1933, and the Canadians established a wheat board to do the same there. The Canadian government required prairie farmers to deliver all their grain to the Canadian Wheat Board (CWB), a single-selling-desk agency that supplanted private wheat marketing in western Canada. Meanwhile, the United States government subsidized farm incomes with domestic-use taxes and import tariffs, but otherwise preserved private wheat marketing.

Cotton

In the colonial era, small amounts of high quality long-staple cotton were produced in the Sea Islands off the coast of South Carolina. Inland, only short-staple cotton could be grown but it was full of seeds and very hard to process into fiber. The invention of the cotton gin in the late 1790s for the first time made short-staple cotton usable.  It was generally produced on plantations ranging from South Carolina westward, with the work done by slaves. Simultaneously, the rapid growth of the industrial revolution in Britain, focused on textiles, created a major demand for the fiber.  Cotton quickly exhausts the soil, so planters used their large profits to buy fresh land to the west, and purchase more slaves from the border states to operate their new plantations. After 1810, the emerging textile mills in New England also produced a heavy demand. By 1820, over 250,000 bales (of 500 pounds each) were exported to Europe, with a value of $22 million. By 1840, exports reached 1.5 million bales valued at $64 million, two thirds of all American exports. Cotton prices kept going up as the South remained the main supplier in the world.  In 1860, the US shipped 3.5 million bales worth $192 million.

After the American Civil War, cotton production expanded to small farms, operated by white and black tenant farmers and sharecroppers. The quantity exported held steady, at 3,000,000 bales, but prices on the world market fell. Although there was some work involved in planting the seeds, and cultivating or holding out the weeds, the critical labor input for cotton was in the picking.  How much a cotton operation could produce depended on how many hands (men women and children) were available.  Finally in the 1950s, new mechanical harvesters allowed a handful of workers to pick as much as 100 had done before.  The result was a large-scale exodus of the white and black cotton farmers from the south.  By the 1970s, most cotton was grown in large automated farms in the Southwest.

See also
Agriculture in the United States
Cotton production in the United States
Corn production in the United States

References

Bibliography

Surveys
 Cochrane, Willard W.  The Development of American Agriculture: A Historical Analysis (1993)
 Danbom, David B.  Born in the Country: A History of Rural America (1997)
 Fite, Gilbert C. American Farmers: The New Minority (Indiana U. Press, 1981) online
 Goreham, Gary. Encyclopedia of rural America (Grey House Publishing, 2 vol 2008).  232 essays
 Gras, Norman. A history of agriculture in Europe and America, (1925). online edition
 Hart, John Fraser.  The Changing Scale of American Agriculture. U. of Virginia Press, 2004. 320 pp.
 Hurt, R. Douglas. American Agriculture: A Brief History (2002)
 Mundlak, Yair. "Economic Growth: Lessons from Two Centuries of American Agriculture." Journal of Economic Literature 2005 43(4): 989–1024. 
 Ogle, Maureen. In meat we trust: An unexpected history of carnivore America (2013).
 Robert, Joseph C.  The story of tobacco in America (1949) online edition
 Russell, Howard. A Long Deep Furrow: Three Centuries of Farming In New England (1981) online
 Schafer, Joseph. The social history of American agriculture (1936) online edition
 Schapsmeier, Edward L; and Frederick H. Schapsmeier. Encyclopedia of American agricultural history (1975) online

 Schlebecker John T. Whereby we thrive: A history of American farming, 1607–1972 (1972) online
 Skaggs, Jimmy M. Prime cut: Livestock raising and meatpacking in the United States, 1607-1983 (Texas A&M UP, 1986).
 Taylor, Carl C. The farmers' movement, 1620–1920 (1953) online edition
 Walker, Melissa, and James C. Cobb, eds. The New Encyclopedia of Southern Culture, vol. 11: Agriculture and Industry. (University of North Carolina Press, 2008) 354, pp. 

Before 1775
 Anderson, Virginia DeJohn, "Thomas Minor's World: Agrarian Life in Seventeenth-Century New England," Agricultural History, 82 (Fall 2008), 496–518.
 Bidwell, Percy and Falconer, John I. History of Agriculture in the Northern United States 1620–1860 (1941)  online
 Galenson, David. "The Settlement and Growth of the Colonies," in Stanley L. Engerman and Robert E. Gallman (eds.), The Cambridge Economic History of the United States: Volume I, The Colonial Era (1996).
 Kulikoff, Allan. From British Peasants to Colonial American Farmers (1992) online
 Kulikoff, Allan. Tobacco and slaves: the development of southern cultures in the Chesapeake, 1680-1800 (1986) online
 McCusker, John J. ed. Economy of British America, 1607–1789 (1991), 540pp online
 Russell, Howard. A Long Deep Furrow: Three Centuries of Farming In New England (1981)
 Weeden, William Babcock Economic and Social History of New England, 1620–1789 (1891)  964 pages; online edition

1775–1860

North
 Bidwell, Percy and Falconer, John I. History of Agriculture in the Northern United States 1620–1860 (1941) online
 Gates, Paul W. The Farmers' Age: Agriculture, 1815–1860 (1960) online

 South 
 Craven, Avery Odelle. Soil exhaustion as a factor in the agricultural history of Virginia and Maryland, 1606–1860 (1926) online edition
 Gray, Lewis Cecil. History of Agriculture in the Southern United States to 1860. 2 vol (1933), classic in-depth history online edition
 Genovese, Eugene. Roll, Jordan Roll (1967), the history of plantation slavery
 Olmstead, Alan L., and Paul W. Rhode, "Biological Innovation and Productivity Growth in the Antebellum Cotton Economy," Journal of Economic History, 68 (Dec. 2008), 1123–71.
 Phillips, Ulrich B.  "The Economic Cost of Slaveholding in the Cotton Belt," Political Science Quarterly 20#2 (Jun., 1905), pp. 257–75 in JSTOR
 Phillips, Ulrich B.  "The Origin and Growth of the Southern Black Belts." American Historical Review, 11 (July, 1906): 798–816. in JSTOR
 Phillips, Ulrich B. "The Decadence of the Plantation System." Annals of the American Academy of Political and Social Sciences, 35 (January, 1910): 37–41. in JSTOR
 Phillips, Ulrich B.  "Plantations with Slave Labor and Free." American Historical Review, 30 (July 1925): 738–53. in JSTOR

1860-present, national

 Cyclopedia of American agriculture; a popular survey of agricultural conditions, ed by L. H. Bailey, 4 vol 1907–1909. online edition highly useful compendium.
 Bosso, Christopher J. Framing the Farm Bill: Interests, Ideology, and Agricultural Act of 2014 (University Press of Kansas, 2017).
 Brunner, Edmund de Schweinitz. Rural social trends (1933) online edition
 Conkin, Paul K. A Revolution Down on the Farm: The Transformation of American Agriculture since 1929 (2009) excerpt and text search
 Dean, Virgil W.  An Opportunity Lost: The Truman Administration and the Farm Policy Debate. U. of Missouri Press, 2006. 275 pp.
 Friedberger, Mark.  Farm Families and Change in 20th Century America (2014)
 Gardner, Bruce L.  "Changing Economic Perspectives on the Farm Problem." Journal of Economic Literature (1992) 30#1 62–101. in JSTOR
 Gardner, Bruce L. American Agriculture in the Twentieth Century: How it Flourished and What it Cost (Harvard UP,  2002).
 Gates, Paul W. Agriculture and the Civil War (1985) online
 Gee, Wilson. The place of agriculture in American life (1930) online edition
 Lord, Russell. The Wallaces of Iowa (1947) online edition
 Lyon-Jenness, Cheryl. "Planting a seed: the nineteenth-century horticultural boom in America." Business History Review 78.3 (2004): 381–421.
 Mayer, Oscar Gottfried. America's meat packing industry; a brief survey of its development and economics. (1939) online edition
 McCormick, Cyrus. The century of the reaper; an account of Cyrus Hall McCormick, the inventor (1931) online edition
 Mullendore, William Clinton. History of the United States Food Administration, 1917–1919 (1941) online edition
 Nourse, Edwin Griswold. Three years of the Agricultural Adjustment Administration (1937) online edition
 Perren, Richard, "Farmers and Consumers under Strain: Allied Meat Supplies in the First World War," Agricultural History Review (Oxford), 53 (part II, 2005), 212–28.
 Sanderson, Ezra Dwight. Research memorandum on rural life in the depression (1937) online edition
 Schultz, Theodore W.  Agriculture in an Unstable Economy. (1945) by Nobel-prize winning conservative online edition
  Shannon, Fred Albert. Farmer's Last Frontier: Agriculture, 1860–1897 (1945) online edition comprehensive survey
 Wilcox, Walter W. The farmer in the second world war (1947) online edition
 Zulauf, Carl, and David Orden. "80 Years of Farm Bills – Evolutionary Reform." Choices (2016) 31#4 pp. 1–7 online

1860-present, regional studies
 Cyclopedia of American agriculture; a popular survey of agricultural conditions, ed by L. H. Bailey, 4 vol 1907–1909. online edition highly useful compendium
 Black, John D. The Rural Economy of New England: A regional study (1950) online edition
 Cannon, Brian Q., "Homesteading Remembered: A Sesquicentennial Perspective," Agricultural History, 87 (Winter 2013), 1–29.
 Clawson, Marion. The Western range livestock industry, (1950) online edition
 Dale, Edward Everett. The range cattle industry (1930) online edition
 Danbom, David B. Sod Busting: How families made farms on the 19th-century Plains  (2014)
 Fite, Gilbert C. The Farmers' Frontier: 1865–1900 (1966), the west
 Friedberger, Mark. "The Transformation of the Rural Midwest, 1945–1985," Old Northwest, 1992, Vol. 16 Issue 1, pp. 13–36
 Friedberger, Mark W. "Handing Down the Home Place: Farm Inheritance Strategies in Iowa" Annals of Iowa 47.6 (1984): 518–36. online
 Friedberger, Mark. "The Farm Family and the Inheritance Process: Evidence from the Corn Belt, 1870–1950." Agricultural History 57.1 (1983): 1–13. uses Iowa census and sales data
 Friedberger, Mark. Shake-Out: Iowa Farm Families in the 1980s (1989)
 Fry, John J. "" Good Farming-Clear Thinking-Right Living": Midwestern Farm Newspapers, Social Reform, and Rural Readers in the Early Twentieth Century." Agricultural History (2004): 34–49.
 Gisolfi, Monica Richmond, "From Crop Lien to Contract Farming: The Roots of Agribusiness in the American South, 1929–1939," Agricultural History, 80 (Spring 2006), 167–89.
 Hahn, Barbara, "Paradox of Precision: Bright Tobacco as Technology Transfer, 1880–1937," Agricultural History, 82 (Spring 2008), 220–35.
 Hurt, R. Douglas. "The Agricultural and Rural History of Kansas." Kansas History 2004 27(3): 194–217.  Fulltext: in Ebsco
 Larson, Henrietta M. The wheat market and the farmer in Minnesota, 1858–1900 (1926). online edition
 MacCurdy, Rahno Mabel. The history of the California Fruit Growers Exchange (1925).  online edition
 Miner, Horace Mitchell. Culture and agriculture; an anthropological study of a corn belt county (1949) online edition
 Nordin, Dennis S. and Scott, Roy V.  From Prairie Farmer to Entrepreneur: The Transformation of Midwestern Agriculture. Indiana U. Press, 2005. 356 pp.
  Sackman, Douglas Cazaux. Orange Empire: California and the Fruits of Eden (2005)
 Saloutos, Theodore. "Southern Agriculture and the Problems of Readjustment: 1865–1877," Agricultural history (April, 1956) Vol 30#2 58–76 online edition
 Sawers, Larry. "The Mule, the South, and Economic Progress." Social Science History 2004 28(4): 667–90.  Fulltext: in Project Muse and Ebsco

Environmental issues
 Craven, Avery Odelle. Soil Exhaustion as a Factor in the Agricultural History of Virginia and Maryland, 1606–1860 (1925)
 Cronon, William. Changes in the Land, Revised Edition: Indians, Colonists, and the Ecology of New England (2nd ed. 2003), excerpt and text search
 Cunfer, Geoff.  On the Great Plains: Agriculture and Environment. (2005). 240 pp.
 McLeman, Robert, "Migration Out of 1930s Rural Eastern Oklahoma: Insights for Climate Change Research," Great Plains Quarterly, 26 (Winter 2006), 27–40.
 Majewski, John, and Viken Tchakerian, "The Environmental Origins of Shifting Cultivation: Climate, Soils, and Disease in the Nineteenth-Century U.S. South," Agricultural History, 81 (Fall 2007), 522–49.
 Melosi, Martin V., and Charles Reagan Wilson, eds. The New Encyclopedia of Southern Culture: Volume 8: Environment (v. 8) (2007)
 Miner, Craig. Next Year Country: Dust to Dust in Western Kansas, 1890–1940 (2006) 371 pp. 
 Silver, Timothy. A New Face on the Countryside: Indians, Colonists, and Slaves in South Atlantic Forests, 1500–1800 (1990) excerpt and text search
 Urban, Michael A., "An Uninhabited Waste: Transforming the Grand Prairie in Nineteenth Century Illinois, U.S.A.," Journal of Historical Geography, 31 (Oct. 2005), 647–65.

Historiography
 Atack, Jeremy. "A Nineteenth-century Resource for Agricultural History Research in the Twenty-first Century." Agricultural History 2004 78(4): 389-412.  Fulltext: in University of California Journals and Ebsco. Large database of individual farmers from manuscript census.
 Bogue, Allan G. "Tilling Agricultural History with Paul Wallace Gates and James C. Malin." Agricultural History 2006 80(4): 436–60.  Fulltext: in Ebsco
 
 Levins, Richard A. Willard Cochrane and the American Family Farm (University of Nebraska Press, 2000.) 88p
 Peters, Scott J. "'Every Farmer Should Be Awakened': Liberty Hyde Bailey's Vision of Agricultural Extension Work." Agricultural History (2006): 190-219. online

Primary sources
 Bruchey, Stuart, ed. Cotton in the Growth of the American Economy: 1790–1860 (1967)
 Carter, Susan, at al. eds. The Historical Statistics of the United States (Cambridge U.P. 2006), 6 vol.; online in many academic libraries;  105 tables on agriculture
 Phillips, Ulrich B. ed. Plantation and Frontier Documents, 1649–1863; Illustrative of Industrial History in the Colonial and Antebellum South: Collected from MSS. and Other Rare Sources. 2 Volumes. (1909). online vol 1 and online vol 2
 Rasmussen, Wayne D., ed. Agriculture in the United States: a documentary history (4 vol, Random House, 1975) 3661pp.  vol 4 online
 Schmidt, Louis Bernard. ed. Readings in the economic history of American agriculture (1925) online edition
 Sorokin, Pitirim et al., eds. A Systematic Sourcebook in Rural Sociology'' (3 vol. 1930), 2000 pages of primary sources and commentary; worldwide coverage

External links
Agricultural History a leading scholarly journal
 Agricultural History Society
 331 historic photographs of American farmlands, farmers, farm operations and rural areas; These are pre-1923 and out of copyright.
Online Libraries of Historical Agricultural Texts and Images USDA, Alternative Farming Systems Information Center

 
Economic history of the United States
Natural history of the United States
History of the United States by topic